Hamra (lit. Red Soil) is an Israeli settlement organized as a moshav in the West Bank. Located in the Jordan Valley and covering 3,500 dunams, it falls under the jurisdiction of Bik'at HaYarden Regional Council.

The international community considers Israeli settlements in the West Bank illegal under international law, but the Israeli government disputes this.

History
The moshav was founded in 1971 and was initially named Atarot, before being renamed after nearby Tel Hamra.

According to ARIJ, Israel confiscated land from two nearby Palestinian villages in order to construct Hamra; 1,370 dunams from Furush Beit Dajan, 192 dunams for a military checkpoint close to Hamra, and an unspecified amount from Beit Dajan.

In 2020, a family at the nearby tiny Humsa al-Tata village, above the Hamra checkpoint, was ordered to destroy their home and concrete castings around contiguous structures, including a well and olive trees, because Israeli declared it was on an archaeological site. The owner stated that they dwelt there from their great-grandfather's time and no one had ever heard of antiquities on their land.

References

Israeli settlements in the West Bank
Moshavim
Agricultural Union
Populated places established in 1971
1971 establishments in the Israeli Military Governorate